Otunba Olusegun Gbeleyi is a Nigerian politician and also a Public Analyst born on 11 October 1962.

Background

He is the son of late (Chief) E. A. O. Gbeleyi, the Otun Oba of Igbesaland and the 2nd Igbesa politician to be elected into House of Representatives in Lagos 1964-1966 representing Egbado South Federal Constituency. His father was also the Junior Federal Minister for Labour & Parliamentary Secretary for Labour under the Sir Tafawa Balewa Government before the first military coup of January 1966.

Political career

1.  Former Deputy speaker Ogun state house of Assembly from 1999 to 2003 under Alliance for Democracy (AD) representing (Ado-Odo/Ota II) in Ogun state Nigeria. Served as Vice Chairman of the following committees: Rules and Business; Finance and General Purpose; and Select committee.

Also served as member of the following committees: Works and Housing; Public Account; Finance & Appropriation; and Local Government & Chieftaincy.  In September, 2000 at the Commonwealth Parliamentary Association (CPA) conference held in London as part of the official delegate representing Nigeria (he moved motion for strong case for debts relief for Nigeria to sustain its then nascent democracy, this motion was unanimously adopted for implementation.)

2. In May 2011, Olusegun Bolanle Gbeleyi, (OBG) was made a member of Governor  Ibikunle Amosun's policy draft committee on local Government and Chieftaincy Affairs.

3. Feb - April 2015,  Olusegun Bolanle Gbeleyi, (OBG) served as a member on the sub-committee of the strategy & planning for SIA Campaign Organisation and played the role of a resource/training person, training party agents and supervisors across the state on conduct of elections & safeguarding votes. Also served as the APC party agent for Ogun West Senatorial District during the 2015 general elections.

4. 2016 to 2019 Governor Ibikunle Amosun made Olusegun Gbeleyi a Consultant to the Ogun State Government on Power.

5.On the 12th of July, 2021 Olusegun Bolanle Gbeleyi, (OBG) was appointed Chairman, Governing Board of the Digital Bridge Institute, (DBI), an International Centre for Information and Communication Technology Studies under the Nigerian Communications Commission, (NCC). Appointment took effect from 24 June 2021

Political Accomplishments
Olusegun Bolanle Gbeleyi, was elected in 1999 as the member representing Ado-Odo/Igbesa State 
Constituency under the platform of the Alliance for Democracy (AD) into the Ogun State House of Assembly. He was subsequently elected by his colleagues as the Deputy Speaker and served meritoriously to the end of his 4-year tenure (1999 to 2003). 
 
Whilst in the House of Assembly, he was twice an official delegate to the 46th Commonwealth Parliamentary Association (CPA) Conference in the UK in 2000 and also at the 48th CPA Conference in Namibia in 2002. At his first appearance at the 46th CPA Conference in London in year 2000, Gbeleyi presented a paper on “Debts Cancellation as a tool for Sustaining Democracy in the Developing Nations,” and moved the motion which was unanimously carried for the debts relief for Nigeria and it was fully implemented during President Olusegun Obasanjo's two terms in office as the Executive President of Nigeria. 
 
He played a prominent role in the creation of additional Local Government Areas which was successfully carried out under Chief Olusegun Osoba, CON. Gbeleyi was also a proponent of the restoration of the 52 Local Government Areas and OBG was delighted when the law was amended to pave the way for additional 37 LCDAs and elections conducted by the immediate past Governor, Senator Ibikunle Amosun, CON, FCA for the 57 LGA/LCDA which has brought government nearer to the people.    
In 2007, he contested for the Ogun West Senatorial seat on the platform of Action Congress (AC) and lost.   
In 2019, he contested for the Ogun West Senatorial seat on the platform of Allied Peoples’ Movement (APM) and lost.   
From 2016 – 2018, he served as the Consultant on Power to Senator Ibikunle Amosun, CON, FCA. He and his other colleagues on the Energy and Power team supervised the successful implementation of an Independent Power Project (IPP), Lisabi Power that now supplies power to all government facilities in Abeokuta, including streetlights, and private offtakers. They also left behind ongoing 12 similar IPPs across the State, including Ipokia, Ota and Agbara. He also supervised the new Transmission power-lines projects of 203 km in Ogun State by the Transmission Commission of Nigeria (TCN). He resigned to contest for the Ogun West Senatorial Seat at the 2019 general elections. 
He was a foundation member of the All Progressives Congress, (APC). Following the crisis of the APC primaries, he picked another platform to contest the 2019 general election and has since returned back home into the APC fold.

Political Project

I. Independent Power Plants (IPP) project been carried out by Sholep Energy Ltd to generate 5MW of Solar power for the use of Ogun State Polytechnic, Ipokia and its environs on, "pay as u go" basis.

II. He is head of the five man monitoring committee supervising the reconstruction of Atan - Agbara road with a flyover bridge.

III. He is also assigned by Governor Ibikunle Amosun to coordinate the World Bank project on new power line routes and five new sub stations.

Notes

1962 births
Living people